Richard Goodman Jones (born 20 January 1920) was a Welsh poet, better known as Dic. He was a resident of Mynytho on the Llŷn Peninsula, Gwynedd.

His life 
Richard was born to his mother Kate, and his father of his same name who died within 1 month of Richard's birth. Though Kate remarried within 9 years, Richard remained an only child, and eventually lost his stepfather in a farming accident.
Richard was brought up in humble circumstances in the North Welsh village Mynytho, where he attended Foel Gron primary school. He never disassociated himself with the area. In 1952 he married Laura Ellen Jones (also of Mynytho) and fathered two children; Sian and Dafydd. He died on 4 March 2013 aged 93 leaving his wife, two children and two grandchildren by his son Dafydd, named Gwyneth Angharad and Alan Goodman.

His work 
Richard explored numerous professions, from being a painter and decorator, an insurance salesman, and a World War II merchant seaman to being a teacher at Pont-y-Gof primary school, in Botwnnog. As a poet, he has won many bardic chairs, but never the National Eisteddfod. Many collections of his work have been published, including Hanes Y Daith and a book about space. He was a renowned writer of the englyn form.

Bibliography 
Caneuon y Gwynt a'r Glaw (1975)
I'r Rhai sy'n gweld Rhosyn Gwyllt (1979)

References

Welsh-language poets
Welsh male poets
People from Gwynedd
1920 births
2013 deaths
20th-century Welsh poets
20th-century British male writers